Centerville is an unincorporated community in Montgomery County in the southwest region of the U.S. commonwealth of Virginia.

The largest employer in the area is Virginia Tech, Virginia's largest university and a national football powerhouse, located in nearby Blacksburg.  Montgomery County is considered the "most wired county in the United States" by Reader's Digest. The town maintains its small-town feel with an eclectic collection of boutiques, restaurants and historic sites, while just a mile away high-tech industry prospers in the Virginia Tech Corporate Research Center (CRC).

Geography
Centerville is located at  (37.1698488, -80.5383898).

References

External links
https://web.archive.org/web/20070417172343/http://www.montgomerycc.org/montgomery.htm

Unincorporated communities in Montgomery County, Virginia